This is a list of P600 mountains in Britain and Ireland by height.  A P600 is defined as a mountain with a topographic prominence above , regardless of elevation or any other merits (e.g. topographic isolation); this is a similar approach to that of the Marilyn, Simms, HuMP and TuMP British Isle mountain and hill classifications.  By definition, P600s have a height above , the requirement to be called a "mountain" in the British Isles.  The "P" terminology is an international classification, along with P1500 Ultras.  P600 and "Majors" are used interchangeably.

, there were 120 P600s in the British Isles: 81 in Scotland, 25 in Ireland, 8 in Wales, 4 in England, 1 in Northern Ireland, and 1 in the Isle of Man.  The 120 P600s contained 54 of the  282 Scottish Munros, and 10 of the 34 Non-Scottish Munros (or Furths), all of which have prominences above , and are sometimes called the "Super-Majors".  The list also contained the highest mountains in Scotland, Wales, Ireland, and England.

On 9 November 2019, Norfolk climber Liam Chase became the first person to complete all 120 P600s in a single calendar year, starting with Cross Fell on 1 January, and ending with Pen y Fan.  Chase was also only the seventh person recorded to have climbed all P600s over any time period.

P600 mountains by height

Dawson's prominence threshold was the normal height threshold for a British Isles mountain,  and 111 mountains met his definition. The current list has 120 mountains, although there is dispute as to whether Moel Siabod's prominence is above 600 metres (2,000 ft), or is in fact just below the threshold at 599.9 metres.

This list below was downloaded from the Database of British and Irish Hills ("DoBIH")  in October 2018.  Note that topographical prominence, unlike topographical elevation, is far more complex to measure and requires a survey of the entire contours of a peak, rather than a single point of height.  These tables are therefore subject to being revised over time, and should not be amended or updated unless the entire DoBIH data is re-downloaded again.

Sub–Majors by height

Since 2006, one of Trengrove's Sub–Majors, Moel Siabod, was re–surveyed and shown to be a P600 "Major".

DoBIH codes

The DoBIH uses the following codes for the various classifications of mountains and hills in the British Isles, which many of the above peaks also fall into:

Prefixes
s	sub
x	deleted
Suffixes
=	twin

See also
List of mountains of the British Isles by height
Lists of mountains and hills in the British Isles
List of mountains in Ireland
List of Munro mountains in Scotland
List of Murdos (mountains)
List of Furth mountains in the British Isles
List of Marilyns in the British Isles

Notes

References

General sources

External links
The Database of British and Irish Hills (DoBIH), the largest database of mountains and hills in the British Isles
Hill Bagging UK & Ireland, the searchable interface for the DoBIH
Alan Dawson, Rob Woodall & Jonathan de Ferranti P600 (the "Majors") Table, pre the revision of Moel Siabod to P600 status
The P600s: The 119 Major Mountains of Britain and Ireland, pre the revision of Moel Siabod to P600 status
The 119 The P600m Peaks in the British Isles, pre the revision of Moel Siabod to P600 status

P600